Ujesh Ranchod (born 17 May 1969) is a Zimbabwean former cricketer who played in one Test and three One Day International (ODI) matches from 1992 to 1993. His only international Test wicket came when he dismissed Sachin Tendulkar on 13 March 1993 in Delhi. His Test match debut was also his maiden first-class match.

References

1969 births
Living people
Zimbabwe Test cricketers
Zimbabwe One Day International cricketers
Zimbabwean cricketers
Mashonaland cricketers
Cricketers from Harare
Zimbabwean people of Indian descent